A side reaction is a chemical reaction that occurs at the same time as the actual main reaction, but to a lesser extent. It leads to the formation of by-product, so that the yield of main product is reduced:

{A} + B ->[{k_1}] P1

{A} + C ->[{k_2}] P2

P1 is the main product if k1> k2. The by-product P2 is generally undesirable and must be separated from the actual main product (usually in a costly process).

In organic synthesis 
B and C from the above equations usually represent different compounds. However, they could also just be different positions in the same molecule.

A side reaction is also referred to as competing reaction when different compounds (B, C) compete for another reactant (A). If the side reaction occurs about as often as the main reaction, it is spoken of parallel reactions (especially in the kinetics, see below).

Also there may be more complicated relationships: Compound A could reversibly but quickly react to substance B (with speed k1) or irreversible but slow (k1> k−1 >> k2) to substance C:

B <=> A ->[{k_2}] C

Assuming that the reaction to substance C is irreversible, as it is thermodynamically very stable. In this case, B is the kinetic and C is the thermodynamic product of the reaction (see also here). If the reaction is carried out at low temperatures and stopped after a short time, it is spoken of kinetic control, primarily the kinetic product B would be formed. When the reaction is carried out at high temperatures and for long time (in which case the necessary activation energy for the reaction to C is available, which is progressively formed over time), it is spoken of thermodynamic control; the thermodynamic product C is primarily formed.

Conditions for side reactions
In organic synthesis, elevated temperatures usually lead to more side products. Side products are usually undesirable, therefore low temperatures are preferred ("mild conditions"). The ratio between competing reactions may be influenced by a change in temperature because their activation energies are different in most cases. Reactions with high activation energy can be more strongly accelerated by an increase in temperature than those with low activation energy. Also, the state of equilibrium depends on temperature.

Detection reactions can be distorted by side reactions.

Kinetics
Side reactions are also described in the reaction kinetics, a branch of physical chemistry. Side reactions are understood as complex reaction, since the overall reaction (main reaction + side reaction) is composed of several (at least two) elementary reactions. Other complex reactions are competing reactions, parallel reactions, consecutive reactions, chain reactions, reversible reactions, etc. [10]

If one reaction occurs much faster than the other one (k1 > k2), it (k1) will be called the main reaction, the other one (k2) side reaction. If both reactions roughly of same speed (k1 ≅ k2) is spoken of parallel reactions.

If the reactions {A} + B ->[{k_1}] P1 and {A} + C ->[{k_2}] P2 are irreversibly  (without reverse reaction), then the ratio of P1 and P2 corresponds to the relative reactivity of B and C compared with A:

See also 
 Rate equation#Parallel or competitive reactions

References 

Chemical reactions